Ashmore is a name used for a suburb in north-eastern Hamilton in New Zealand by Hamilton City Council on its 2010 map and by the developer, CDL Land New Zealand Limited. It is more commonly described as being part of Rototuna North. It is in Rototuna Central census area.

References

See also
Suburbs of Hamilton, New Zealand

Suburbs of Hamilton, New Zealand